Prashant Pillai (born 8 September 1981) is a music producer and composer from India.

Early career

After completing his Sound engineering in Chennai, he went on to work with A.R.Rahman. After a short stint with him, he moved on and settled in Pune, where he started scoring for ad jingles, web sonics, and short films. Pillai considers A.R.Rahman to be his professional guide and mentor.

In early 2004, Pillai got his first break to compose a radio jingle and then went on to compose jingles, for both radio and television consumption.

In the year 2007, Prashant scored music for Bejoy Nambiar's, critically acclaimed short film Rahu where he teamed with singer K. S. Krishnan. Bejoy's uncanny knack of selecting unusual and experimental sounds, resulted in Prashant working on a soundtrack, which he still claims to be his best. Rahu soundtrack features Murtaza and Qadir Khan, sons of the Ustad Ghulam Mustafa Khan. They feature in the soundtrack for the Sufi song, "Betaabi". This song was later used in a Malayalam film City of God.

Film scoring and soundtracks
Prashant's first break in feature films came when debutant Lijo Jose Pellissery roped him for the Malayalam film Nayakan, in March 2010. The film featured actors like Indrajith, Thilakan, Siddique and Jagathy Sreekumar in pivotal roles. Academy Award winner A. R. Rahman released the music of the movie.

Prashant's mentor A.R.Rahman released the soundtrack of Nayakan on 16 March 2010, at Rahman's Panchathan Studios in Chennai. The Nayakan soundtrack features, 6 songs, one of which is sung by Indrajith (the lead of the film) himself. Prashant worked on this project for over one and a half years, and has fused in elements that is new to the Malayali audience.

In 2011, Prashant collaborated with Lijo once again for City of God which opened to mixed reviews. The movie stars Prithviraj and Indrajith as pivotal characters, along with Parvathi, Rima Kallingal and Shwetha Menon.

In 2011, he made his debut into commercial cinema with the Bollywood film Shaitan, directed by his now close friend, mentor and director Bejoy Nambiar, for which Pillai has scored majority of the songs. The film, produced by Anurag Kashyap has a unique soundscape to it; co-composed by eminent composers like Ranjit Barot, Amar Mohile and Anupam Roy. In the same year Prashant scored the original background music for the Malayalam film Bombay March 12 starring National Award winner Mammootty directed by screenwriter Babu Janardhan.

2012 saw Prashant scoring the background music for Siddarth Bharathan's Nidra a remake of his father Bharathan's 1981 film also titled Nidra.  The film wasn't a commercial hit, but the film and its score was appreciated for its definitive style.Prashant also scored background music for MTV Rush, a series of 12 short stories on the leading music and entertainment television channel MTV, directed by Bejoy Nambiar of Shaitan fame.

Jan 2013 saw the release of Prashant's third soundtrack for Bejoy Nambiar, in his film, David. The soundtrack, which was supervised and co-produced by Prashant, is a compilation of various bands like Bram Fatura, Light Years Explode, MaatiBaani as also artists like Remo Fernandes, Anirudh Ravichander and Mikey McCleary. Apart from sound design, Prashant's tracks in the film feature eminent singers like Lucky Ali, Karthik, Shweta Pandit and Naresh Iyer. The film stars Vikram, Neil Nitin Mukesh, Jiiva, Isha Sharvani and Tabu among others, released in Hindi, Tamil and Telugu. He also composed the background score for the Hindi film Issaq directed by Manish Tiwary.

Post City of God Prashant composed the music for Lijo Jose Pellissery's Malayalam musical film titled Amen. The music became very popular and the film subsequently became a major blockbuster. The album featured artists like Ramya Nambeesan, Alyssa Mendonsa and Lucky Ali. This is a romantic comedy featuring actors Indrajith Sukumaran, Fahadh Faasil, Swati of Subramaniapuram fame and Kalabhavan Mani among others. Prashant was subsequently roped in by veteran filmmaker Lal Jose for Ezhu Sundara Rathrikal.

In 2014, composed for Ajith Pillai's Mosayile Kuthira Meenukal and debutant Santhosh Nair's Money Ratnam. 2015 saw four of his films release one of which was Double Barrel, his fourth collaboration with filmmaker Lijo Jose Pellissery and his debut Tamil film Andhra Mess.

Awards
 2013–16th Asianet Film Awards 2014 – Best Music Director – Amen
 2013 – TTK Prestige-Vanitha Film Awards – Best Music Director – Amen

Selected discography

Filmography

Feature films

Short films

References

External links
 Prashant Pillai's official website
  Prashant Pillai's writeup on meeting A.R.Rahman
 Official Facebook Fan Page
 Rediff Reviews – Nayakan
 Vibe Talkies Reviews Nayakan
 YouTube video of A.R.Rahman releasing Nayakan Audio

1981 births
Indian film score composers
Living people
Indian male film score composers